Seng is a surname. Notable people with the surname include:
Seng Saekhu (born c. 1840s), Chinese emigrant to Thailand
Pua Khein-Seng (born 1974), Malaysian businesspeople
Ho Iat-seng (born 1957), Macanese politician
Lim Bo Seng (1909–1944), Chinese-born resistance fighter based in Singapore and Malaya
Tan Tock Seng (1798–1850), Malacca-born merchant and philanthropist from Singapore
Ong Beng Seng (1946), Singapore-based Malaysian billionaire businessman
Theary Seng (born 1971), Cambodian-American human-rights activist
Lee Seng Tee (1923–2022), Singaporean businessman and philanthropist
Joe Seng (1946–2016), American veterinarian

Surnames of Cambodian origin
Korean-language surnames
Khmer-language surnames
Surnames of Chinese origin
Chinese-language surnames